The 1956–57 NCAA football bowl games were a series of post-season games played in December 1956 and January 1957 to end the 1956 NCAA University Division football season. A total of 7 team-competitive games, and two all-star games, were played. The post-season began with the Gator Bowl on December 29, 1956, and concluded on January 5, 1957, with the season-ending Senior Bowl.

Schedule

References